Heliophanoides bhutanicus is a jumping spider species in the genus Heliophanoides that lives in Bhutan. It was first described in 1992.

References

Spiders described in 1992
Fauna of Bhutan
Salticidae
Spiders of Asia